South Pit Halt railway station served South Pit Colliery, located in the village of Glyncorrwg, in the historical county of Glamorganshire, Wales, from 1923 to 1964 on the South Wales Mineral Railway.

History 
The station was opened as Glyncorrwg South Pit on 27 August 1923 by the Great Western Railway. Its name was later changed to South Pit Halt. It was open to miners only. It was relocated to the south in 1956 with new private sidings. The station closed on 2 November 1964. The colliery itself closed in 1970.

References

External links 

Disused railway stations in Neath Port Talbot
Former Great Western Railway stations
Railway stations in Great Britain opened in 1923
Railway stations in Great Britain closed in 1964
1923 establishments in Wales
1964 disestablishments in Wales